Frank Murdoch (1 February 1904 – 1996) was a British sailor. He competed in the 6 Metre event at the 1952 Summer Olympics.

References

External links
 

1904 births
1996 deaths
British male sailors (sport)
Olympic sailors of Great Britain
Sailors at the 1952 Summer Olympics – 6 Metre
Place of birth missing